The Euchites or Messalians were a Christian sect from Mesopotamia that spread to Asia Minor (modern-day Turkey) and Thrace. The name 'Messalian' comes from the Syriac , mṣallyānā, meaning 'one who prays'.

History 
They are first mentioned in the 370s by Ephrem the Syrian, and Epiphanius of Salamis, and Jerome, and are also mentioned by Archbishop Atticus, Theodotus of Antioch, and Archbishop Sisinnius. They were first condemned as heretical in a synod of 383 AD (Side, Pamphylia), whose acta was referred to in the works of Photius. Their leader was supposedly a man named Peter who claimed to be Christ. Before being stoned to death for his blasphemies, he promised his followers that after three days he would rise from his tomb in the shape of a wolf, attracting the title of Lycopetrus or Peter the Wolf. Christians believed it was not Peter who would come out of the grave, but a devil in disguise.

They continued to exist for several centuries, influencing the Bogomils of Bulgaria, who are called Lycopetrians in an abjuration formula of 1027. and, thereby, the Bosnian Church, and Catharism. By the 12th century the sect had reached Bohemia and Germany and, by a resolution of the Council of Trier (1231), was condemned as heretical.

Michael Psellos, a Byzantine monk, accused Bogomils and Euchites of orgiastic practices such as incest and homosexuality. Furthermore, he argued that children born from these promiscuous activities were brought before a Satanic assembly after eight days, offered up to Satan and then cannibalistically eaten. This cannibalistic act was supposedly a parody of baptism. Similar accusations have a long history, and it is debated between historians if they are truthful of any degree. Euthymios Zigabenos is another source for these accusations. The idea of these unholy acts can be tracked back to alleged practices of certain Gnostic sects. A similar literary tradition regarding heresies seems to have been brought into existence already during reign of Seleucid ruler Antiochus IV Epiphanes.

Modern scholarship has questioned, though, whether a coherent heretical movement existed behind these condemnations, and has emphasised instead the friction in the Eastern Church caused by Messalianism's "ascetical practices and imagistic language far more characteristic of Syriac Christianity than of the imperial Church centred on Constantinople".

Teachings
The sect's teaching asserted that:

 The essence (ousia) of the Trinity could be perceived by the carnal senses.
 The Threefold God transformed himself into a single hypostasis (substance) in order to unite with the souls of the perfect.
 God has taken different forms in order to reveal himself to the senses.
 Only such sensible revelations of God confer perfection upon the Christian.
 The state of perfection, freedom from the world and passion, is therefore attained solely by prayer, not through the church, baptism and or any of the sacraments, which have no effect on the passions or the influence of evil on the soul (hence their name, which means "Those who pray").
Messalians taught that once a person experienced the essence of God they were freed from moral obligations or ecclesiastical discipline. They had male and female teachers, the "perfecti", whom they honored more than the clergy. The condemnation of the sect by St John Damascene and Timothy, priest of Constantinople, expressed the view that the sect espoused a sort of mystical materialism. Their critics also accused them of incest, cannibalism and "debauchery" (in Armenia their name came to mean "filthy") but scholars reject these claims.

See also
Constantine Chrysomalus

Bibliography

References

Gnosticism